The Centro Direzionale di Milano is a business district (quartiere) in Milan, Italy, part of the Zone 9 administrative division. It is located north-west of the city centre, between the major railway stations of Milano Centrale and Milano Porta Garibaldi. The district developed in the second half of the 20th century; its realization was planned by the city administration to relieve congestion in the city centre by moving business and tertiary activities in the new area. Coherently with this plan, the district is mainly occupied by modern office buildings, including several of Milan's skyscrapers.

History

The district was originally designed to accommodate office buildings for tertiary activities. A relevant part of the design effort focused on the realization of adequate infrastructures supporting heavy daily commute, although only some of the corresponding projects were actually implemented. The main transportation hub in the area is Porta Garibaldi railway station, with connection to the Milan Metro, the suburban network and national rail lines. 

Overall, the realization of the new district took place between 1955 and 1962, but was later suspended as a consequence of the lack of an actual regulation preventing tertiary activities to be established in the city centre.

For several years thereafter, the Centro Direzionale remained an heterogeneous and sparse area. Some skyscrapers were built (including the Pirelli Tower, the Galfa Tower, and the Servizi Tecnici Comunali Tower) but other areas remained undeveloped and fell in decay. A major example of the inconsistent use of urban areas in the district was the establishment of the Varesine "Luna Park" (now dismissed) amidst a supposedly office and financial district.

The development of the district was resumed in the early 21st century, when a completely new project was approved by the city authorities. Centro Direzionale is now a large working site, with several urban renewal works in progress. These include the realization of a large shopping mall devoted to fashion (nicknamed 'Città della Moda', Fashion City), residential blocks, new skyscrapers, and a large city park.

References
 Maurizio Grandi and Attilio Pracchi (1980), "Il Centro direzionale", in Milano. Guida all'architettura moderna, Zanichelli, pp. 320–327. .

External links

 Official site of the "Porta Nuova" urban renewal project

Districts of Milan